The following teams and players took part in the men's volleyball tournament at the 1976 Summer Olympics, in Montreal.

Brazil
The following volleyball players represented Brazil:
 Alexandre Abeid
 Antônio Carlos Moreno
 Bernard Rajzman
 Alexandre Kalache
 Elói de Oliveira
 Fernandão
 Suíço
 José Roberto Guimarães
 Bebeto de Freitas
 Paulo Peterle
 Sérgio Danilas
 William Carvalho da Silva

Canada
The following volleyball players represented Canada:
 Alan Taylor
 Bruno Prasil
 Donald Michalski
 Ed Alexiuk
 Elias Romanchych
 Garth Pischke
 Gregory Russell
 John Paulsen
 Kerry Klostermann
 Larry Plenert
 Pierre Bélanger
 Tom Graham

Cuba
The following volleyball players represented Cuba:
 Leonel Marshall Sr.
 Victoriano Sarmientos
 Ernesto Martínez
 Víctor García
 Carlos Salas
 Raúl Vilches
 Jesús Savigne
 Lorenzo Martínez
 Diego Lapera
 Antonio Rodríguez
 Alfredo Figueredo
 Jorge Pérez Vento

Czechoslovakia
The following volleyball players represented Czechoslovakia:
 Jaroslav Penc
 Jaroslav Stančo
 Jaroslav Tomáš
 Josef Mikunda
 Josef Vondrka
 Milan Šlambor
 Miroslav Nekola
 Pavel Řeřábek
 Štefan Pipa
 Vladimír Petlák
 Vlastimil Lenert
 Drahomír Koudelka

Egypt
The following volleyball players represented Egypt:
 Fouad Salam Alam
 Gaber Mooti Abou Zeid
 Hamid Mohamed Azim
 Ibrahim Fakhr El-Din
 Samir Loutfi El-Sayed
 Attia El-Sayed Aly
 Aysir Mohamed El-Zalabani
 Mahmoud Mohamed Farag
 Ihab Ibrahim Hussein
 Azmi Mohamed Megahed
 Metwali Mohamed
 Mohamed Saleh El-Shikshaki

Italy
The following volleyball players represented Italy:
 Andrea Nannini
 Andrea Nencini
 Erasmo Salemme
 Fabrizio Nassi
 Francesco Dall'Olio
 Giorgio Goldoni
 Giovanni Lanfranco
 Marco Negri
 Mario Mattioli
 Paolo Montorsi
 Rodolfo Giovenzana
 Stefano Sibani

Japan
The following volleyball players represented Japan:
 Katsumi Oda
 Katsutoshi Nekoda
 Kenji Shimaoka
 Mikiyasu Tanaka
 Seiji Oko
 Shoichi Yanagimoto
 Tadayoshi Yokota
 Takashi Maruyama
 Tetsuo Nishimoto
 Tetsuo Sato
 Yasunori Yasuda
 Yoshihide Fukao

Poland
The following volleyball players represented Poland:
 Włodzimierz Stefański
 Bronisław Bebel
 Lech Łasko
 Edward Skorek
 Tomasz Wójtowicz
 Wiesław Gawłowski
 Mirosław Rybaczewski
 Zbigniew Lubiejewski
 Ryszard Bosek
 Włodzimierz Sadalski
 Zbigniew Zarzycki
 Marek Karbarz

South Korea
The following volleyball players represented South Korea:
 Jo Jae-hak
 Jeong Mun-gyeong
 Gang Man-su
 Kim Chung-han
 Kim Geon-bong
 Lee In
 Lee Hui-won
 Lee Chun-pyo
 Lee Seon-gu
 Lee Yong-gwan
 Im Ho-dam
 Park Gi-won

Soviet Union
The following volleyball players represented the Soviet Union:
 Anatoliy Polishchuk
 Vyacheslav Zaytsev
 Yefim Chulak
 Vladimir Dorokhov
 Aleksandr Yermilov
 Pāvels Seļivanovs
 Oleh Molyboha
 Vladimir Kondra
 Yury Starunsky
 Vladimir Chernyshov
 Vladimir Ulanov
 Aleksandr Savin

References

1976